Quantitative InfraRed Thermography Journal is a peer-reviewed scientific journal published by Taylor & Francis. It was founded in 2004 by the QIRT committee, with a strong connection to the QIRT conference. According to the Journal Citation Reports, the journal has a 2016 impact factor of 1.062.

Topics covered  
Quantitative InfraRed Thermography Journal covers all aspects of Thermography, with topics ranging from instrumentation, theoretical and experimental practices, data reduction and image processing related to infrared thermography.

Article categories 
The journal publishes articles in the following categories:

 Original research articles
 Research reviews

Abstracting and indexing
The journal is abstracted and indexed in:
 Science Citation Index
 Scopus

References

External links 
 Journal Homepage
 QIRT Website

Publications established in 2004
English-language journals
Engineering journals
Taylor & Francis academic journals
Biannual journals